The mixed group (GM) is a parliamentary group active in both houses of the Italian Parliament, the Chamber of Deputies and the Senate. The groups comprise all the deputies and the senators, respectively, who are not members of any other parliamentary group. For them, membership of the Mixed Groups is the default option.

Members of the Mixed Groups may form sub-groups reflecting their party affiliation. Three deputies are needed for the formation of a sub-group in the Chamber, while individual senators can form sub-groups in the Senate.

Composition 2022–present

Chamber of Deputies

Senate of the Republic

Composition 2018–2022
At the end of the 18th legislature, the group was composed by the following members:

Chamber of Deputies

Senate of the Republic

Composition 2013–2018
As of March 2018, the Groups included 62 deputies and 28 senators. The then President of the Chamber of Deputies, Laura Boldrini, belonged to the Mixed Group.

At the end of the 17th Legislature, the group was composed by the following members:

Chamber of Deputies

Senate of the Republic

Composition 2008–2013
At the end of the 16th Legislature, the group was composed by the following members:

Chamber of Deputies

Senate of the Republic

Composition 2006–2008
At the end of the 15th Legislature, the group was composed by the following members:

Chamber of Deputies

Senate of the Republic

Composition 2001–2006
At the end of the 14th Legislature, the group was composed by the following members:

Chamber of Deputies

Senate of the Republic

Composition 1996–2001
At the end of the 13th Legislature, the group was composed by the following members:

Chamber of Deputies

Senate of the Republic

References

Parliamentary groups in Italy
Technical parliamentary groups